Bonito de Minas is a municipality in the northeast of the Brazilian state of Minas Gerais.   the population was 11,369 in a total area of 3,901 km2.  The elevation is 629 meters.  It became a municipality in 1995.

Bonito de Minas is part of the statistical microregion of Januária.  It is surrounded by the following municipalities:  Januária, Montalvânia, Cônego Marinho, and the state of Bahia.  It is connected by poor roads to the regional center of Januária to the south.    The distance is 48 kilometers.  The Serra dos Tropeiros and the boundary with the state of Bahia are to the north.

This is one of the poorest municipalities in the state and in the country.  The main economic activities are cattle raising and farming with modest production of rice, beans, corn, and lemons.  In 2006 there were 695 rural producers with a total area of 63,936 hectares.  Cropland made up 4,800 hectares.  There were only 36 tractors.  In the urban area there were no financial institutions .  There were 13 automobiles, giving a ratio of about one automobile for every 676 inhabitants, one of the worst in the country.  Health care was provided by 1 public health clinic.  There were no hospitals.

Municipal Human Development Index
MHDI: .580 (2000)
State ranking: 849 out of 853 municipalities 
National ranking: 4,979 out of 5,138 municipalities 
Life expectancy: 64
Literacy rate: 62 
Combined primary, secondary and tertiary gross enrolment ratio: .744
Per capita income (monthly): R$49.12 (For the complete list see Frigoletto)

References

See also
List of municipalities in Minas Gerais

Municipalities in Minas Gerais